Anti-Imperialist League may refer to:

 All-America Anti-Imperialist League (1925–1933), mass organization of the Communist Party USA
 American Anti-Imperialist League (1898–1921), political organization established in response to the Spanish–American War
 Anti-Imperialist League, a name used by the Communist Party (India) in Punjab during the early 1930s; see Naujawan Bharat Sabha
 A misnomer for the League Against Imperialism